Whaley House may refer to:

Whaley House (Arcata, California), listed on the National Register of Historic Places (NRHP) in Humboldt County, California
Whaley House (San Diego, California), listed on the NRHP
Marion S. Whaley Citrus Packing House, Rockledge, Florida, listed on the NRHP
Robert J. Whaley House, Flint, Michigan, listed on the NRHP
Whaley Homestead, Stevensville, Montana, listed on the NRHP in Ravalli County, Montana
W. B. Smith Whaley House, Columbia, South Carolina, listed on the NRHP
Whaley House (Longview, Texas), listed on the NRHP in Gregg County, Texas